James Winchester (September 13, 1772 – April 5, 1806) was a United States district judge of the United States District Court for the District of Maryland.

Education and career

Born on September 13, 1772, in Shawan, Province of Maryland, British America, Winchester was a member of the Maryland House of Delegates from 1794 to 1796.

Federal judicial service

Winchester received a recess appointment from President John Adams on October 31, 1799, to a seat on the United States District Court for the District of Maryland vacated by Judge William Paca. He was nominated to the same position by President Adams on December 5, 1799. He was confirmed by the United States Senate on December 10, 1799, and received his commission the same day. His service terminated on April 5, 1806, due to his death in Shawan, Maryland.

References

Sources
 

1772 births
1806 deaths
Members of the Maryland House of Delegates
Judges of the United States District Court for the District of Maryland
United States federal judges appointed by John Adams
18th-century American judges